The 11th Filmfare Awards were held in 1964, honoring the best films in Hindi Cinema in 1963. 

Dil Ek Mandir and Gumrah led the ceremony with 8 nominations each, followed by Bandini with 6 nominations.

Bandini won 6 awards, including Best Film, Best Director (for Bimal Roy) and Best Actress (for Nutan), thus becoming the most-awarded film at the ceremony.

Best Film
 Bandini 
Gumrah
Dil Ek Mandir

Best Director
 Bimal Roy – Bandini 
B. R. Chopra – Gumrah
C. V. Sridhar – Dil Ek Mandir

Best Actor
 Sunil Dutt – Mujhe Jeene Do 
Ashok Kumar – Gumrah
Rajendra Kumar – Dil Ek Mandir

Best Actress
 Nutan – Bandini 
Mala Sinha – Bahu Rani
Meena Kumari – Dil Ek Mandir

Best Supporting Actor
 Raj Kumar – Dil Ek Mandir 
Johnny Walker – Mere Mehboob
Mehmood – Ghar Basakar Dekho

Best Supporting Actress
 Shashikala – Gumrah 
Ameeta – Mere Mehboob
Nimmi – Mere Mehboob

Best Story
 Bandini – Jarasandha 
Dil Ek Mandir – C.V. Sridhar
Gumrah – B.R. Films

Best Dialogue
 Dil Ek Mandir – Arjun Dev Rashk

Best Music Director 
 Taj Mahal – Roshan 
Dil Ek Mandir – Shankar-Jaikishan
Mere Mehboob – Naushad

Best Lyricist
 Taj Mahal – Sahir Ludhianvi for Jo Vaada Kiya 
Gumrah – Sahir Ludhianvi for Chalo Ek Baar
Mere Mehboob – Shakeel Badayuni for Mere Mehboob Tujhe

Best Playback Singer
 Gumrah – Mahendra Kapoor for Chalo Ek Baar 
Mere Mehboob – Mohammad Rafi for Mere Mehboob Tujhe
Taj Mahal – Lata Mangeshkar for Jo Vaada Kiya

Best Art Direction
 Mere Mehboob

Best Cinematography, B&W
 Bandini

Best Cinematography, Color
 Sehra

Best Editing
 Gumrah

Best Sound
 Bandini

Biggest Winners
Bandini – 6/6
Gumrah – 3/8
Dil Ek Mandir – 2/8
Taj Mahal – 2/3

See also
13th Filmfare Awards
12th Filmfare Awards
Filmfare Awards

References
https://www.imdb.com/event/ev0000245/1964/

Filmfare Awards
Filmfare
1963 in Indian cinema